Whitefish Lake is located in the Thunder Bay District in Northwestern Ontario, Canada, near the village of Nolalu. The lake contains walleye, pike, and small mouth bass but is noted for its perch fishing. The average depth of Whitefish Lake is seven feet. Access to the lake is a public launch located on Highway 588 and many independent tourist resorts. The lake drains into Lake Superior via the Little Whitefish River.

References 

Lakes of Thunder Bay District